Leung Kwun Chung (born 1 April 1992 in Hong Kong) is a Hong Kong professional football player who plays as a defensive midfielder for Hong Kong Premier League club Eastern.

He is the older brother of current Zhejiang Pro player Leung Nok Hang.

Club career

Leung played for Hong Kong Third Division club Sham Shui Po when he was young.

In 2012, Leung signed for Hong Kong First Division club Yokohama FC Hong Kong.

On 18 May 2015, Leung won the Hong Kong Top Footballer Awards 2014/15 Best Youth Player.

Before the start of the 2015–16 Hong Kong Premier League, Leung signed for Hong Kong Premier League club Pegasus.

On 3 February 2016, Leung scored his first goal in the 2015–16 Hong Kong FA Cup against Hong Kong First Division club Wanchai, which wins the match 6:1.

On 6 June 2018, Leung confirmed that he had renewed his contract with Tai Po.

On 17 July 2019, Leung moved to Eastern.

International career
On 31 December 2015, Leung made his debut for Hong Kong against Guangdong in the 2016 Guangdong–Hong Kong Cup, which the match ended in a 4:5 loss in aggregate.

Leung made his first International 'A' match debut on 3 June 2016, against Vietnam.

Career statistics

International

Honours

Club
Eastern
 Hong Kong Senior Shield: 2019–20
 Hong Kong FA Cup: 2019–20

Sham Shui Po
 Hong Kong Second Division: 2010–11
 Hong Kong Third Division: 2009–10
 Hong Kong Third Division District League: 2009–10

Pegasus
 Hong Kong Sapling Cup: 2015–16

Tai Po
 Hong Kong Premier League: 2018–19

Individual
 Best Young Player: 2014–15

References

External links
 Leung Kwun Chung at HKFA
 
 

1992 births
Living people
Hong Kong footballers
Hong Kong international footballers
Hong Kong First Division League players
Hong Kong Premier League players
Association football defenders
Footballers at the 2014 Asian Games
Sham Shui Po SA players
TSW Pegasus FC players
South China AA players
Tai Po FC players
Eastern Sports Club footballers
Asian Games competitors for Hong Kong